Hilda Dokubo is a Nigerian award-winning  film actress, activist and youth advocate who once served as special adviser on youth affairs to Peter Odili, a former governor of Rivers State.

Early life and education
Hilda Dokubo was born as the first of six children in Buguma, a town in Asari-Toru, Rivers State where she went on to complete her primary and secondary school education at St Mary State School Aggrey Road and Government Girls Secondary School respectively. Her father was an engineer, while her mother was a school teacher . She is an alumna of the University of Port Harcourt where she earned her bachelor's degree and master's degrees in Theatre Arts.

Career
Dokubo made her screen debut during her youth service in a 1992 film titled Evil Passion. She has since been featured in, and has produced several Nigerian films.  including Gone Forever, End of the Wicked, My Goodwill, and The CEO   Upon starring in a supporting role in a 2015 film titled Stigma, Dokubo won Best Actress in a Supporting Role and best actress in the comedy category   11th Africa Movie Academy Awards. In 2019, she featured in the movie Locked, a story about mental health awareness    She founded and runs a non-governmental organisation, the Centre for Creative Arts Education (CREATE), which deploys the creative arts to empower women and the youth

Activism 
In June 2020, Dokubo joined other protesters in a street march in Lagos against rape and other violent crimes against women  In October 2020, she was part of the End SARS protests in Port-Harcourt against police brutality  Alongside Kate Henshaw in March 2020, Dokubo launched an online protest against the appointment of Senator Ishaku Elisha Dabo of Adamawa North Senatorial District as a patron of the Actors Guild of Nigeria

Filmography 

Without Love
Forever (1995)
Jezebel
Evil Passion(1996)
Hour of Grace
 Fatal Desire
Error of the Past (2000)
Sweet Mother (2000)
Black Maria (1997)
End of the Wicked (1999)
 "Confidence" 
Onye-Eze (2001)
My Good Will (2001)
Light & Darkness (2001)
A Barber's Wisdom (2001)
My Love (1998)
Above Death: In God We Trust (2003)
World Apart (2004)
With God (2004)
Unfaithful (2004)
Chameleon (2004)
21 Days With Christ (2005)
Gone Forever (2006)
Stigma (2013)
The CEO (2016)
"Locked (2019)

Fatal

Awards and nominations

References

External links

Living people
Actresses from Rivers State
Advisers to the Governor of Rivers State
20th-century Nigerian actresses
21st-century Nigerian actresses
University of Port Harcourt alumni
Activists from Rivers State
People from Buguma
1967 births
Nigerian Academy of Science
Nigerian film actresses
Nigerian activists
People from Rivers State
Nigerian film producers